The 1890 New York Giants baseball team was a member of the short lived Players' League. They compiled a 74–57 record, good for third place, eight games behind the league champion Boston Reds. After the season, the league folded, and the Giants were bought out by their National League counterpart.  The Giants were the original tenants of the Polo Grounds stadium that afterwards was occupied by the National League's New York Giants for 66 years.

Regular season

Season standings

Record vs. opponents

Roster

Player stats

Batting

Starters by position 
Note: Pos = Position; G = Games played; AB = At bats; H = Hits; Avg. = Batting average; HR = Home runs; RBI = Runs batted in

Other batters 
Note: G = Games played; AB = At bats; H = Hits; Avg. = Batting average; HR = Home runs; RBI = Runs batted in

Pitching

Starting pitchers 
Note: G = Games pitched; IP = Innings pitched; W = Wins; L = Losses; ERA = Earned run average; SO = Strikeouts

Relief pitchers 
Note: G = Games pitched; W = Wins; L = Losses; SV = Saves; ERA = Earned run average; SO = Strikeouts

References 
1890 New York Giants (PL) season at Baseball Reference

New York Giants (PL) season